Air Vice Marshal John Hugh Thompson,  (born 18 September 1947) is a former Royal Air Force officer who became Head of the British Defence Staff in Washington, D.C. from 2000 until his retirement in 2002.

RAF career
Educated at Fielding High School in New Zealand, Thompson joined the Royal Air Force in 1970. He became Station Commander at RAF Wittering in 1988, Senior Air Staff Officer at RAF Rheindahlen in 1993 and an assistant to the High Representative for Bosnia and Herzegovina in 1996. He went on to be Commandant of the Royal Air Force College Cranwell in 1997 and Head of the British Defence Staff and Defence Attaché in Washington, D.C. in 2000 before retiring in 2002.

References

 

1947 births
Companions of the Order of the Bath
Living people
Royal Air Force air marshals
British air attachés
Commandants of the Royal Air Force College Cranwell